Alvan-e Eshareh (also Romanized as Alvān-e Eshāreh and ‘Alāvān-e ‘Eshāreh; also known as Alwān) is a village in Azadeh Rural District, Moshrageh District, Ramshir County, Khuzestan Province, Iran. At the 2006 census, its population was 185, in 39 families.

References 

Populated places in Ramshir County